Death to Smoochy is a 2002 satirical black comedy crime film directed by Danny DeVito and written by Adam Resnick. Starring Robin Williams, Edward Norton, DeVito, Catherine Keener and Jon Stewart, the film centers on "Rainbow" Randolph Smiley (Williams), a disgraced former children's television host who attempts to sabotage his replacement, Sheldon Mopes (Norton), and his character, Smoochy the Rhino.

Produced by Film4 Productions and Andrew Lazar's Mad Chance Productions, Death to Smoochy was released in the United States on March 29, 2002, by Warner Bros. Pictures. The film was met with mixed-to-negative reviews from critics and was a huge box office bomb, grossing only $8.3 million against a budget of $50 million. Despite this, in recent years it has garnered a cult following.

Plot 
"Rainbow" Randolph Smiley is the host of a popular children's television show on Kidnet. Despite appearing friendly and playful on-screen in the studio, he is actually an alcoholic and criminal in reality. The FBI arrest him for accepting bribes and he is fired, his show is canceled, and he is thrown out of his penthouse and left homeless. Kidnet orders executive Marion Stokes to hire a new host who is "squeaky clean", Stokes selects the naive Sheldon Mopes and his character Smoochy the Rhino. Mopes is uniquely sincere and dedicated to providing quality children's entertainment, which puts him at odds with his new producer Nora Wells. The Smoochy Show quickly becomes tremendously popular, causing Rainbow Randolph to fixate his anger on Mopes. Randolph turns to Stokes and pleads for help to get his job back, but Stokes refuses. The deranged Randolph then hatches several poorly planned attempts to get Mopes fired, all of which fail. Finally hitting rock bottom, Randolph turns to his former partner Angelo Pike for help.  Angelo feeds Randolph and allows him to stay at his apartment.

Mopes finds himself losing creative control over his show and hires corrupt talent agent Burke Bennett to renegotiate his contract. Bennett introduces Mopes to the dark side of the entertainment business by giving him a gun and trying to convince him to work with a corrupt charity. While having dinner with Burke, Mopes is introduced to mobster Tommy Cotter. Tommy pressures Mopes into giving her cousin Spinner a role on his show, and Mopes casts him as Smoochy's cousin Moochy. Tommy tells Mopes that in return for casting Spinner, she will make sure he is protected.

Burke becomes impatient with Mopes and books him to star in a Smoochy ice show, run by Merv Green and his corrupt charity Parade of Hope. Mopes refuses to do the show despite Burke's warnings, in response Green personally threatens Mopes to do the show. In the meantime, Randolph manages to trick Mopes into performing his Smoochy act at a Neo-Nazi rally. Mopes is branded a racist and loses his job and show, and Nora refuses to help him. Randolph visits Nora to ask for his job back but accidentally reveals that he set Mopes up. Nora tells Tommy, who tracks down Randolph with her crew and force him to confess that he tricked Mopes. Sheldon's reputation and show are restored and the media dubs Randolph the most hated man in America. Angelo kicks Randolph out of his apartment after Randolph angrily destroys the TV. Nora and Mopes reconnect and begin a romantic relationship.

Mopes decides to host his own ice show, without the corrupt charities involved. Burke and Stokes, under pressure from Green, plot to kill Mopes and hire a new host who will accommodate their corruption. Their plan backfires when Green's men mistake Spinner in his Moochy costume for Mopes and murder him. An enraged Tommy retaliates by killing Green and his men. Randolph confronts Mopes and Nora in their apartment at gunpoint and reveals that Nora had affairs with several kid show hosts, including Randolph himself. Mopes manages to calm Randolph down and disarm him, allowing Randolph to remain in the apartment until Mopes could explain everything to the police.

Burke and Stokes decide to hire former Kidnet host Buggy Ding Dong to kill Sheldon during the ice show. Randolph intervenes and saves Mopes by killing Buggy. Mopes realizes that Burke and Stokes set him up and threatens Burke with a gun. Tommy and her crew arrive in time to stop Mopes and Tommy decides to handle the matter herself (murdering them offscreen, in a deleted scene). Mopes and Nora kiss in Times Square, and Smoochy and Randolph launch a new show together alongside Nora, who becomes an ice skater.

Cast 
 Robin Williams as "Rainbow" Randolph Smiley, a former kid show host who fell from grace after being arrested for accepting bribes. The loss of his job and home cause Randolph to become emotionally disturbed, and he becomes fixated on getting Mopes fired so that he can return to his old life.  
 Edward Norton as Sheldon Mopes/Smoochy the Rhino, a struggling entertainer whom Kidnet taps as Rainbow Randolph's replacement. He is considered "squeaky clean" as he lives a scandal-free life and teaches positivity and healthy living with his act. He is also very naive and struggles to adapt to the dark world of television.  
 Danny DeVito as Burke Bennett, a corrupt talent agent who represents Mopes in his contract negotiations with Kidnet.  Burke is involved in embezzling money from charity events that his clients host, and he pressures Mopes to cooperate with the scheme.
 Catherine Keener as Nora Wells, a television producer who coordinates the filming of Kidnet's shows. She and Mopes clash at first, but develop a romantic relationship.  
 Jon Stewart as Marion Frank Stokes, a Kidnet executive who oversees the network programming. He is also involved in embezzling money and is torn between the network's orders and the pressure he receives to get skimmed money flowing again.  
 Pam Ferris as Tommy Cotter, a boss in the Irish mob. She convinces Mopes to give her cousin Spinner a part on TV, and to show her gratitude she vows to protect Mopes from harm.
 Michael Rispoli as Spinner Dunn/Moochy the Rhino, a retired boxer with brain damage who becomes obsessed with the Smoochy Show. Mopes gives Spinner the role of Moochy at the urging of Tommy Cotter.
 Harvey Fierstein as Merv Green, the morally corrupt organizer of the Parade of Hope charity. Green uses Kidnet talent to host fundraising ice shows, with the proceeds syphoned off for personal gain.  
 Danny Woodburn as Angelo Pike, a former cast member on Rainbow Randolph's show who goes to work for the Smoochy show. He is the only person willing to help the deranged Randolph, giving him a place to stay and taking care of him.  
 Vincent Schiavelli as Buggy Ding Dong, another former Kidnet show host who ends up a homeless heroin addict. In desperation, Burke and Stokes hire him to murder Mopes with the promise of getting his old show back if he succeeds.
 Robert Prosky as the Chairman of Kidnet. He orders Stokes to find a new show host that won't generate any controversy.
 Tracey Walter as Ben Franks

Production

Preproduction
In November or December 2000, screenwriter Adam Resnick wrote the screenplay for the film, while art designers sketched designs for the characters for the film. In the original screenplay, the Smoochy costume was orange. The final film used a pink costume instead.

Filming
Principal photography began in January 2001. Sequences were filmed in several locations in New York City such as Times Square, Coney Island, Upper West Side and Duane Street in Lower Manhattan. A brief shot of the North Tower of the World Trade Center can be seen where Rainbow Randolph is dancing on the small bench in Duane Park. In the DVD commentary, Danny DeVito says it was the only shot in the movie that the towers were in. No changes were made after the September 11th, 2001 terrorist attacks. Filming production moved to Canada on spring 2001. The KidNet studios scenes were shot in several areas in Toronto. In the ice show scene with Smoochy and Rainbow, Robin's stuntdouble Elvis Stojko choreographed some of the skating moves for Rainbow Randolph. Robin was off stage. Filming ended in May 2001.

Home media 
The film was released on VHS and DVD on September 17, 2002.

Reception

Critical response
On Rotten Tomatoes, Death to Smoochy holds an approval rating of 42% based on 119 reviews with an average rating of 5.3/10. The site's critical consensus states, "The talent involved can't save a script that has nowhere to go with its promising premise." On Metacritic, the film has a score of 38 out of 100, based on 30 critics, indicating "generally unfavorable reviews". Audiences polled by CinemaScore gave the film an average grade of "C" on an A+ to F scale.

Roger Ebert of The Chicago Sun-Times gave the film an extremely negative review (giving it half a star out of four), saying that "Only enormously talented people could have made Death to Smoochy. Those with lesser gifts would have lacked the nerve to make a film so bad, so miscalculated, so lacking any connection with any possible audience. To make a film this awful, you have to have enormous ambition and confidence, and dream big dreams." He named the film the Worst of the Year. Todd McCarthy of Variety also gave the film a negative review, saying that the film "pushes its dark, smart, clever, cynical, satirical, nasty, provocative and sarcastic instincts to the point of heavily diminished returns—to the point where the very amusing premise just isn't funny anymore." Peter Travers of Rolling Stone wrote: "This black-comic assault on family entertainment is going to set a lot of teeth on edge—If only his (DeVito's) material were better this time."

Conversely, J. Hoberman of The Village Voice praised the film, saying that "Death to Smoochy is often very funny, but what's even more remarkable is the integrity of DeVito's misanthropic vision." David Sterritt of The Christian Science Monitor called the film a "razor-sharp satire" and "the most refreshingly outrageous movie of the season."

Box office
Though it received a wide release by playing in 2,164 theaters its opening weekend in the United States, the film was a box-office bomb after grossing only $4,266,463 its opening weekend and a mere $8,382,691 overall, with negligible box-office receipts outside the American/Canadian market.

Accolades
Robin Williams received a Razzie Award nomination for Worst Supporting Actor for his performance as Randolph in this film, but lost to Hayden Christensen for his performance in Star Wars: Episode II – Attack of the Clones.

References

External links 

 
 
 
 

2002 films
2000s English-language films
2002 black comedy films
2000s crime comedy films
2000s satirical films
American black comedy films
American crime comedy films
American satirical films
American films about revenge
British black comedy films
British crime comedy films
British satirical films
Films directed by Danny DeVito
Films produced by Peter MacGregor-Scott
Films with screenplays by Adam Resnick
Films scored by David Newman
Films about television
Films about television people
Films about the Irish Mob
Films about alcoholism
Films about assassinations
British films set in New York City
Films shot in New York City
Films shot in Toronto
Films shot in Hamilton, Ontario
Film4 Productions films
Warner Bros. films
2000s American films
2000s British films